Frederick Arthur Smith (16 April 1914 – 1982) was an English footballer who played at centre forward for Bury in the 1930s.

Smith joined Bury in 1936 and made a handful of appearances before joining Bradford (Park Avenue) in 1938. After a successful 1938–39 season, when he scored 21 goals from 29 league appearances, his professional career was ended by the Second World War.

1914 births
1982 deaths
English footballers
Association football forwards
Bury F.C. players
Bradford (Park Avenue) A.F.C. players
English Football League players
Footballers from Liverpool